Alexander Russell Bolling (August 28, 1895 – June 4, 1964) was a lieutenant general in the United States Army during World War II and the Cold War.

Military career

Bolling was a student at the United States Naval Academy at Annapolis from 1915 to 1916, but he left the academy and enlisted in the United States Army. He was sent to France during World War I, where he earned a battlefield commission. While in command of a company of the 4th Infantry, 3rd Division, in the Boise-des-Nesles, on the night of July 14, 1918, Second Lieutenant Bolling earned the Distinguished Service Cross, the citation reading:

Prior to World War I, Bolling was sent to Fort Bliss, Texas, where he chased Mexican Bandit Pancho Villa along with fellow Lt. George S. Patton. He was promoted to the rank of captain, which he held for 12 years.

Bolling commanded the 84th Infantry Division in the European Theater of Operations during World War II. After the war, Bolling was promoted to lieutenant general in 1952 and assumed command of the Third United States Army.

Personal
Bolling's awards included the Distinguished Service Cross, Army Distinguished Service Medal with oak leaf cluster, Silver Star, Legion of Merit, Bronze Star Medal, and Purple Heart.

Upon his retirement in 1955, Bolling made his home in Satellite Beach, Florida. He died on June 4, 1964, and was buried in Arlington National Cemetery.

Bolling was the father of Major General Alexander R. "Bud" Bolling Jr., the father-in-law of Major General Roderick Wetherill and Lieutenant Colonel C.L. Thomas, and grandfather of Lieutenant Colonel Roderick Wetherill Jr.

References

 Encyclopedia of the Korean War. Spencer C. Tucker, ed. Santa Barbara, ABC-CLIO, 2000.  .
 The Forgotten War. Clay Blair, New York, Random House, 1987.

External links

Generals of World War II

1895 births
1964 deaths
United States Army personnel of World War I
Military personnel from Philadelphia
People from Satellite Beach, Florida
Burials at Arlington National Cemetery
Recipients of the Distinguished Service Cross (United States)
Recipients of the Distinguished Service Medal (US Army)
Recipients of the Silver Star
Recipients of the Legion of Merit
United States Army generals of World War II
United States Army generals
United States Army Infantry Branch personnel